Twickenham Cemetery is a cemetery at Hospital Bridge Road, Whitton in the London Borough of Richmond upon Thames. It was established in 1868 and was expanded in the 1880s when the local parish churchyards were closed to new burials.

Notable burials
 Hylda Baker (d. 1986), comedienne, actress and music hall performer
 Herbert Mills Birdwood (d. 1907), British Indian judge and civil servant, naturalist and botanist
 William Birdwood, 1st Baron Birdwood (d. 1951), who commanded the ANZAC forces during the Gallipoli Campaign in 1915 and became Commander-in-Chief, India in 1925
 Frederick James Camm (d. 1959), technical author and magazine editor
 "Fast Eddie" Clarke (d. 2018), rock musician
 Leonard N. Fowles (d. 1939), organist, choirmaster and composer, best remembered for his hymn tunes "Golders Green" and "Phoenix"
 Francis Francis (d. 1886), angler and novelist
 Edward Stanley Gibbons (d. 1913), stamp dealer and founder of Stanley Gibbons Ltd, publishers of the Stanley Gibbons stamp catalogue
 Joseph Jackson Howard (d. 1902), genealogist, and Maltravers Herald of Arms Extraordinary 1887–1902
 Norman Cyril Jackson (d. 1994), recipient of the Victoria Cross
 Leonard Jack Lewis (d. 2005), television director
 Laurence Oliphant (d. 1888), author, traveller, diplomat and Christian mystic
 Jonathan Peel (d. 1879), Secretary of State for War
 Ernst Roth (d. 1971), music publisher
 Elizabeth Twining (d. 1889), English painter, author, and botanical illustrator
 Herbert Edgar Weston (d. 1961), stamp dealer

Gallery

References

External links
 Official website: Twickenham Cemetery
 Twickenham Cemetery map
 

1868 establishments in England
Cemeteries in the London Borough of Richmond upon Thames
Whitton, London